Portersville is an unincorporated community in Perry County, in the U.S. state of Ohio. The town borders neighboring Morgan County and is in Bearfield Township.

History
Portersville was laid out in 1848 by John Porter, and named for him.  A post office called Portersville was established in 1849, and remained in operation until 1941.

References

Unincorporated communities in Perry County, Ohio
Unincorporated communities in Ohio
1848 establishments in Ohio